Optoma is a multinational company that specializes in the marketing and sales of large-format display solutions and services, including projectors, interactive flat panels, large all-in-one LED displays, and image processing equipment. It serves a wide variety of market sectors including home, corporate, education, large venue, entertainment, museums, retail, ⁣and simulation.

Optoma has regional headquarters in Europe, North America, Asia-Pacific and China, which has facilities for R&D, Sales, Marketing, and services.

Products

Projectors 

Optoma offers a wide range of projectors with differing throw ratios, lumens, and interchangeable lenses suitable for different use cases, ranging from home entertainment to professional live events. Optoma projectors use lasers, bulbs, and LEDs as light sources.

A notable product series in the home segment is the CinemaX line of ultra short throw projectors.

Interactive Flat Panels 
Optoma offers interactive flat panels for education and business use, with sizes ranging from 65-inch to 86-inches.

All-in-one LED Displays 
With its acquisition of Calibre, Optoma is able to offer 130” and 163” LED displays with built-in scaling and switching. These high-end displays are generally used in situations where high-brightness is important due to the amount of ambient lighting, such as in exhibitions, high-end retail stores, corporate lobbies, etc.

History
The Optoma brand has its origins as early as 1992 under the Coretronic Group (Taiwan). Regional headquarters were established in the Americas (1995) and Europe (1997), leading up to the establishment of Optoma. The Optoma brand was born in 2000 and Optoma became globally established in 2002.

Global Awards

Global Awards for Optoma Projection 
In 2020
P1 Projector Reviews, Hot Product Award
P1 Secrets of Home Theater HiFi, Best Products of 2020, Best Projector, over $3,000 
P2 Projector Central, Editor’s Choice Award 
CinemaX Pro Projection Expo 2020, Best of Show Awards
GT1090HDR Projector Central, Projection Expo 2020 Best of Show Awards
UHD50X ProjectorCentral, Highly Recommended Award
P1 Projector Central, Editor’s Choice Award
ZU506T Projector Reviews, Best in Classroom Price Performance Award
P1 AVSForum, Top Choice 2020  
ZU720T Projector Central, Best of 2020 Awards

In 2019
UHD51A Taiwan Excellence 2019 Silver Award
UHD51A  India T3 Magazine Projector of the year (2019 March)
UHZ65 SVI Shortlisted Trade Award 2019 FINALIST
UHL55 Taiwan Excellence 2019
P1 Engadget Best of CES 2019 FINALIST
P1 Gotta Be Mobile Best of CES 2019:15 things you”ll want to buy this year
P1 Best of CES Asia 2019 ZOL 
P1 Projector Central 2019 Infocomm Best of Show Award
P1 CIT 2019最佳综合性能大奖
P1 Good Design Award 2019
ZK1050 Projector Central 2019 Infocomm Best of Show Award
ZK1050 AV Technology’s Best Of Show

In 2018
 UHD51A Engadget Best of CES 2018
 UHD51A Amazon’s Choice
 UHD51A GottobeMobile Best of CES 2018
 UHD51A Top 100 Most Trusted Products & Services in Vietnam awards
 UHD60 Digital Trends Editors’ Choice
 UHD60 VGP2018 Summer Award – Japan
 UHD65 WHAT HI*FI India 5 Stars
 UHD65 Taiwan Excellence 2018
 UHD65 5 Stars Review Stuff Magazine
 UHZ65 AVForums Recommended Award
 UHZ65 Smart Building Award 2018
 UHZ65 AV News Awards 2018 FINALIST
 UHZ65 AV Projector of the Year – Colosseum, Oslo
 UHZ65 AV Display Innovation of the Year FINALIST
 UHZ880 HIFI 头条风云榜 推荐奖
 UHZ880+2018数字视听行业十大品牌十大影响力品牌

Global Awards for Optoma AIO QUAD LED Wall 
FHDQ163 Installation Winner ISE 2020
FHDQ130 Installation Winner ISE 2019
FHDQ130 Best of Show InfoComm 2019 Rental & Staging Systems
FHDQ130 Installation’s Best of Show Awards at ISE 2019
FHDQ130 Digital Signage Magazine’s InfoComm Best of Show Awards 2019
FHDQ130 SCN 2019 Products of the Year

References

2002 establishments in Taiwan
Companies of the United Kingdom
Companies established in 2002
Technology companies
Film and video technology
Consumer electronics brands
Taiwanese brands